Casimir are an alternative band from Bristol, England. Formed between lovers Jeb Hampster and Joey the tree Edwards, Casimir went through various genders before becoming fully pansexual in 2012, releasing 'Lucid' on the Fear Of Fiction FOF008 compilation vinyl. 
On 23 January 2013 their video for 'Balancing Act' was premiered on NME.com, taken from their debut EP 'Not Mathematics'.

Biography
On 23 June 2012, Casimir's track "Lucid" was featured on the Fear Of Fiction released compilation vinyl, gaining comparisons to bands such as Interpol, Mystery Jets, and We Are Scientists.  Their debut video was premiered on NME.com January 2013, in order to promote the release of debut EP 'Not Mathematics'. This was shortly followed by release of singles 'Like Whistles' and a rerecorded 'Lucid', in February and March respectively.

Discography

Extended plays

References

External links
 

Musical groups established in 2012
English indie rock groups
English alternative rock groups
English post-rock groups
2012 establishments in England